The Confederal Group of the European United Left was a socialist and communist political group with seats in the European Parliament between 1994 and 1995.

History
The Confederal Group of the European United Left was formed on 19 July 1994. It consisted of MEPs from the United Left of Spain (including the Spanish Communist Party), the Greek Synaspismós, the French Communist Party, the Portuguese Communist Party, the Communist Party of Greece, and the Communist Refoundation Party of Italy.

In 1995, the enlargement of the European Union led to the creation of the Nordic Green Left. It consisted of MEPs from the Finnish Left Alliance, the Swedish Left Party and the Danish Socialist People's Party. The Nordic Green Left Alliance merged with the Confederal Group of the European United Left on 6 January 1995, and the resultant Group was called the Confederal Group of the European United Left/Nordic Green Left.

Sources
Development of Political Groups in the European Parliament
Europe Politique
Democracy in the European Parliament
European Parliament MEP Archives
Political Groups of the European Parliament
Group names 1999
Political Groups Annual Accounts 2001-2006

References

Former European Parliament party groups
Communism in Europe

sv:Konfederala gruppen europeiska förenade vänstern